Jawalamukhi Road railway station is a small railway station in Kangra district in the Indian state of Himachal Pradesh. The station lies on Pathankot–Jogindernagar narrow-gauge railway. This railway is also called Kangra Valley Railway. It was allotted the railway code of JMKR under the jurisdiction of Firozpur railway division. This line was planned in 1926 and commissioned in 1929.

Major trains 
 Pathankot–Joginder Nagar Kangra Valley Passenger
 Baijnath–Pathankot Kangra Valley Rail Passenger
 Joginder Nagar–Pathankot Kangra Valley Passenger
 Pathankot–Jawalamukhi Road Kangra Valley Passenger

References

See also
 Palampur Himachal railway station
 Joginder Nagar railway station
 Kangra railway station
 Pathankot Junction railway station

Railway junction stations in India
Railway stations in Kangra district
Firozpur railway division
Railway stations opened in 1903

British-era buildings in Himachal Pradesh